Georgina Bardach Martin (born August 18, 1983 in Córdoba) is a swimmer from Argentina. At the 2002 FINA Short Course World Championships in Moscow, she finished third in the 400 m Individual Medley race. She also won the gold medal at the 2003 Pan American Games in Santo Domingo.

At the 2004 Summer Olympics in Athens, she won the bronze medal in the Women's 400 m Individual Medley competition. Her time was 4:37.51. Bardach also competed at the 2000 Summer Olympics in Sydney, 2008 Olympics in Beijing and 2012 Olympics in London but did not advance out of the preliminary heats.

Georgina won the bronze medal at the 2007 Pan American Games in Rio de Janeiro.

At the Brazilian Swimming Championship of May 2006, Georgina broke the South American record for 200 meters backstroke in long course swim pools with 2:17.033 seconds, 6 milliseconds ahead of Fabíola Molina's 1997 mark.

In 2010 she was granted the Platinum Konex Award as the best swimmer of the last decade in Argentina.

See also
Swimming at the 2004 Summer Olympics

References

External links

1983 births
Living people
Argentine people of Arab descent
Sportspeople from Córdoba Province, Argentina
Argentine female swimmers
Olympic swimmers of Argentina
Olympic bronze medalists for Argentina
Swimmers at the 2000 Summer Olympics
Swimmers at the 2004 Summer Olympics
Swimmers at the 2008 Summer Olympics
Swimmers at the 2012 Summer Olympics
Swimmers at the 1999 Pan American Games
Swimmers at the 2003 Pan American Games
Swimmers at the 2007 Pan American Games
Swimmers at the 2011 Pan American Games
Olympic bronze medalists in swimming
Pan American Games gold medalists for Argentina
Pan American Games bronze medalists for Argentina
Pan American Games medalists in swimming
Female medley swimmers
Medalists at the FINA World Swimming Championships (25 m)
Medalists at the 2004 Summer Olympics
South American Games gold medalists for Argentina
South American Games silver medalists for Argentina
South American Games bronze medalists for Argentina
South American Games medalists in swimming
Competitors at the 2006 South American Games
Medalists at the 2003 Pan American Games
Medalists at the 2007 Pan American Games